Yayuk Basuki and Romana Tedjakusuma were the defending champions, but none competed this year.

Petra Kamstra and Tina Križan won the title by defeating Nana Miyagi and Stephanie Reece 2–6, 6–4, 6–1 in the final.

Seeds

Draw

Draw

References

External links
 Official results archive (ITF)
 Official results archive (WTA)

1995 WTA Tour
Commonwealth Bank Tennis Classic